John Frederick Keller (November 10, 1928 – October 6, 2000) was an American basketball player who competed in the 1952 Summer Olympics. He competed in three games as a member of the American basketball team, which won the gold medal.

He died in Great Bend, Kansas where he had lived since 1952.

References

1928 births
2000 deaths
American men's basketball players
Basketball players at the 1952 Summer Olympics
Basketball players from Kansas
Garden City Broncbusters men's basketball players
Kansas Jayhawks men's basketball players
Medalists at the 1952 Summer Olympics
Olympic gold medalists for the United States in basketball
People from Great Bend, Kansas
People from Logan County, Kansas
United States men's national basketball team players